Fairlight is a village in the Canadian province of Saskatchewan within the Rural Municipality of Maryfield No. 91 and Census Division No. 1. The village lies just south of Provincial Highway 48 and the Canadian National Railway, about a kilometre west of Highway 8.

History 
Fairlight incorporated as a village on October 5, 1909.

Demographics 

See also 

 List of communities in Saskatchewan
 Villages of Saskatchewan

References

External links

Villages in Saskatchewan
Maryfield No. 91, Saskatchewan
Division No. 1, Saskatchewan